Joaquín Belgrano (1773–1848) was an Argentine patriot, who participated in the defense of Buenos Aires against the English, and who took part in the May Revolution, as one of the neighbors attending the Cabildo Abierto of May 22, 1810. He was one of Manuel Belgrano's brothers.

Biography 

He was born in Buenos Aires, son of Domingo Belgrano and María Josefa González Casero. He was married to Catalina María Marcelina Melián y Correa, daughter of Antonio Melián Betancour, born in Seville, and María Josefa Correa Lescano, belonging to a Creole family of Buenos Aires.. 

Joaquín Belgrano completed his secondary education at the Royal College of San Carlos, and was possibly graduated in law in Chuquisaca. He began his career in 1790 as a customs employee in the Aduana of Buenos Aires. In 1804, he was appointed as Royal Honorary Officer, by the viceregal authorities. In addition to taking part in the May Revolution, he was one of the editors of the 
Argentine Constitution of 1826.

He served as mayor of first vote in 1813, and as second in 1820. He also served as judge of peace of Monserrat and as deputy of the town of San José de Flores.

References 

1773 births
1848 deaths
People from Buenos Aires
Spanish colonial governors and administrators
Argentine politicians
Argentine Army officers
Argentine people of Ligurian descent
Argentine people of Spanish descent
Río de la Plata